Mustafa Akbaş (born 30 May 1990) is a Turkish footballer who plays as a defender for Erzurumspor.

Club career

Early career
Akbas spent time in the youth systems of both Bahcecikspor and Trabzonspor during his youth.

1461 Trabzon
In 2009, Akbas was sold by Trabzonspor to affiliate club 1461 Trabzon. He made 118 league appearances with the club, scoring four goals. His league debut came on 24 October 2009 in a 2–0 home win against Erzurumspor. This was also his first start for the club. His first goal came nearly two years later on 16 October 2011 in a 2–1 away loss to Saraykoy 1926. He scored in the 36th minute, making the score 2–1. In the 2011–12 season, he helped his side to promotion to the TFF First League.

Trabzonspor
In 2014, Akbas was brought back to Trabzonspor. His first league appearance back with Trabzonspor was a 0–0 away draw against Konyaspor on 2 March 2014. His first goal for Trabzonspor came on 21 December 2014 in a 3–3 away draw against Bursaspor. He scored in the 80th minute, making the score 3-3.

Kayserispor (Loan)
In the summer of 2015, Akbas was loaned out to Kayserispor. He made 28 league appearances on his loan spell. The first of these came on 22 August 2015 in a 1–1 home draw against Konyaspor. He was brought on as a substitute for Srđan Mijailović in the 46th minute.

Yeni Malatyaspor 
After terminating his contract with Trabzonspor, he has joined Süper Lig side Yeni Malatyaspor on 10 January 2019.

References

External links
 
 

1990 births
Sportspeople from Trabzon
Living people
Turkish footballers
Turkey B international footballers
Yeni Malatyaspor footballers
Association football defenders
1461 Trabzon footballers
Trabzonspor footballers
Kayserispor footballers
Gençlerbirliği S.K. footballers
Büyükşehir Belediye Erzurumspor footballers
Süper Lig players
TFF First League players
TFF Second League players